The women's 100 metre butterfly S12 event at the 2012 Paralympic Games took place on 2 September, at the London Aquatics Centre in the Olympic Park, London. The event was for athletes included in the S12 classification, which is for competitors with visual impairments. Eight swimmers took part, representing a total of seven different nations. Poland's Joanna Mendak won the gold medal.

Results
Eight swimmers were involved in the competition which progressed directly to a final with no heats contested.

References

Swimming at the 2012 Summer Paralympics
2012 in women's swimming